Tul Aram (also Romanized as Ţūl Ārām; also known as Lūleh Rām) is a village in Chehel Chay Rural District, in the Central District of Minudasht County, Golestan Province, Iran. At the 2006 census, its population was 203, in 47 families.

References 

Populated places in Minudasht County